Table tennis at the 2013 Asian Youth Games was held in Wutaishan Gymnasium, Nanjing, China between 17 and 19 August 2013.

Medalists

Medal table

Results

Boys' singles

First stage
17–18 August

Group A

Group B

Group C

Group D

Group E

Group F

Group G

Group H

Group I

Group J

Group K

Group L

Knockout stage

Girls' singles

First stage
17–18 August

Group A

Group B

Group C

Group D

Group E

Group F

Group G

Group H

Group I

Group J

Group K

Group L

Knockout stage

References
Boys First Stage
Boys Bracket
Girls First Stage
Girls Bracket

External links
Official Website

2013 Asian Youth Games events
Asian Youth Games
Asian Youth Games
2013